On December 22, 2001, a failed shoe bombing attempt occurred aboard American Airlines Flight 63. The aircraft, a Boeing 767-300ER (registration N384AA) with 197 passengers and crew aboard, was flying from Charles de Gaulle Airport in Paris, France, to Miami International Airport in the U.S. state of Florida.

The perpetrator, Richard Reid, was subdued by passengers after unsuccessfully attempting to detonate plastic explosives concealed within his shoes. The flight was diverted to Logan International Airport in Boston, escorted by American jet fighters, and landed without further incident. Reid was arrested and eventually sentenced to three life terms plus 110 years, without parole.

Incident

As Flight 63 was flying over the Atlantic Ocean, Richard Reid, an Islamic fundamentalist from the United Kingdom and self-proclaimed al-Qaeda operative, carried shoes that were packed with two types of explosives. He had been refused permission to board the flight the day before.

Passengers on the flight complained of a smoky smell shortly after the meal service. One flight attendant, Hermis Moutardier, walked the aisles of the plane to locate the source. She found Reid sitting alone near a window, attempting to light a match. Moutardier warned him that smoking was not allowed on board the aircraft, and Reid promised to stop.

A few minutes later, Moutardier found Reid leaning over in his seat and unsuccessfully attempted to get his attention. After she asked him what he was doing, Reid grabbed at her, revealing one shoe in his lap, a fuse leading into the shoe, and a lit match. He was unable to detonate the bomb: perspiration from his feet dampened the triacetone triperoxide (TATP) and prevented it from igniting.

Moutardier tried grabbing Reid twice, but he pushed her to the floor each time, and she screamed for help. When another flight attendant, Cristina Jones, arrived to try to subdue Reid, he fought her and bit her thumb.

A doctor administered diazepam found in the flight kit of the aircraft. Many of the passengers only became aware of the situation when the pilot announced that the flight was to be diverted to Logan International Airport in Boston.

Two F-15 fighter jets escorted Flight 63 to Logan Airport. The plane parked in the middle of the runway, and Reid was arrested on the ground while the rest of the passengers were bused to the main terminal. Authorities later found over 280 grams (10 oz) of TATP and PETN hidden in the hollowed soles of Reid's shoes, enough to blow a substantial hole in the aircraft. He pleaded guilty, and he was convicted, sentenced to three life terms plus 110 years without parole and incarcerated at ADX Florence, a supermax federal prison in Colorado.

Aftermath 
Six months after the crash of American Airlines Flight 587 in Queens, New York, on November 12, 2001, Mohammed Mansour Jabarah agreed to cooperate with American authorities in exchange for a reduced sentence. He said that fellow Canadian Abderraouf Jdey had been responsible for the flight's destruction, using a shoe bomb similar to that found on Reid several months earlier. However, it was revealed during the crash investigation that pilot error, not terrorism, brought down the plane. Jabarah was a known colleague of Khalid Sheikh Mohamed, and said that Reid and Jdey had both been enlisted by the al-Qaeda chief to participate in identical plots.

In 2006, security procedures at American airports were changed in response to this incident, with passengers required to remove their shoes before proceeding through scanners. The requirement was phased out for some travelers, particularly those with TSA PreCheck, in 2011. Also in 2011, the rules were relaxed to allow children 12 and younger and adults 75 and older to keep their shoes on during security screenings.

Flight Number 63 continues to be used on the route from Paris to Miami, although the route now operates with a Boeing 777, as American Airlines has retired the 767. N384AA was converted to a cargo aircraft in 2019 following its retirement and now operates for Amerijet International, reregistered as N349CM.

See also

Pan Am Flight 103, Pan Am plane destroyed by PETN bomb, killing 270 people – event happened 13 years exactly prior to the shoe bomb incident
1994 Philippine Airlines Flight 434, test run for al-Qaeda Operation Bojinka, killing one plane passenger in bombing
1995 Bojinka plot, al-Qaeda plot to blow up 12 planes as they flew from Asia to the US
2006 Transatlantic Aircraft Plot, failed plot to blow up at least 10 planes as they flew from the UK to the US and Canada
2009 Christmas Day bomb plot, failed al-Qaeda PETN bombing of plane
2010 cargo plane bomb plot, failed al-Qaeda PETN bombing of plane
List of accidents and incidents involving commercial aircraft
List of terrorist incidents, 2001
List of thwarted Islamist terrorist attacks
September 11 attacks

References

External links
Bomb on Flight 63 Telegraph Media Group Limited 2015

Attacks in the United States in 2001
2001 crimes in the United States
Terrorist incidents in the United States in 2001
Islamic terrorism in the United States
Failed airliner bombings
Suicide bombing
Airline occurrences
Uses of shoes
Airliner bombings in the United States
2001 in Boston
Logan International Airport
December 2001 events in France
December 2001 events in the United States